The Texas Legends are an American professional basketball team in the NBA G League based in Frisco, Texas, and are affiliated with the Dallas Mavericks. The Legends play their home games at the Comerica Center. The team began as the Colorado 14ers in 2006, before relocating to Frisco in 2009 and becoming the Texas Legends for the 2010–11 season.

Franchise history

Colorado 14ers
In 2006, Colorado businessmen Tim Wiens and John Frew, who were building the Broomfield Event Center at the Arista development in Broomfield, Colorado, acquired a new minor league basketball team to attract fans in the northwest Denver-Boulder region. In February, they formed two teams, the minor league hockey team Rocky Mountain Rage, and the Colorado 14ers, originally a Continental Basketball Association club. In April, the 14ers entered the NBA Development League and began their first season. The team was named after Colorado's 14,000-foot mountain peaks.

2006–07 season
Joe Wolf, who played with the Denver Nuggets in the 1990s, was the 14ers' first coach, and put together the roster. The team won 28–22 in its first season, and broke various records for Colorado minor league basketball, from scoring to attendance. The team's leaders included Von Wafer and Louis Amundson, who joined the NBA by the end of the season. Despite losing streaks and roster reorganizations, the team qualified for the playoffs. The 14ers won the Western Division before losing the championship in overtime to the Dakota Wizards.

2007–08 season
The 14ers' second season began with an almost new roster, with only Elton Brown and Eric Osmundson staying. New players included Kaniel Dickens, a top player on the team. Eddie Gill was selected in the draft, joined the NBA before the first game, and returned to the team later. Kevin Hill, the only Canadian, was drafted. Five others joined the NBA, including the simultaneous call-ups of Dickens and Billy Thomas on February 22, 2008, by the Cleveland Cavaliers. Despite turnover, the 14ers played well, finishing with one more win than the prior season. The 14ers' six consecutive wins at the end of the season put them in the playoffs as a wild card, but they lost in the first round to the Los Angeles D-Fenders.

2008–09 season
The 14ers' third season had the most consecutive seasons played by any minor league basketball franchise in Colorado. The season began with financial issues for the owners and a new coach, Robert MacKinnon. Joe Wolf had moved to the NBA. The new roster included Eddie Gill, Billy Thomas, and Jamar Brown, who had played for the Colorado Crossover. New players, Dominique Coleman and Josh Davis, played well, as did Sonny Weems, assigned from the Denver Nuggets three times to play during the regular season and playoffs. Early in the season, the 14ers led the D-League in wins and set the D-League record for points in a single game with a 147–119 win over the Rio Grande Valley Vipers on March 10. The 14ers later broke that record with a 155–127 win over the Albuquerque Thunderbirds on April 8. Finishing with a record of 34 wins, the 14ers played at home for the playoffs, and defeated the Erie BayHawks, Austin Toros, and Utah Flash to become the D-League champions.

Texas Legends
On June 18, 2009, a Dallas Mavericks executive, Donnie Nelson, purchased the 14ers, and moved the team to Frisco, Texas. They played in 2010–11 with a new nickname, color, and logo. On November 5, 2009, women's basketball pioneer Nancy Lieberman became the Legends' head coach, the first woman to lead a men's professional basketball team. The team played in the 2010–11 season out of the Comerica Center. The Legends hired other notable basketball professionals for their front office, including 1986 Slam Dunk Champion Spud Webb as president of basketball operations and 1995 NBA Coach of the Year Del Harris as general manager.

Televised games introduced the Legends to fans of the 16-team league. They were on national TV during Versus three times, and appeared twice on Fox Sports Southwest. The game against the Rio Grande Valley Vipers on Versus was their first TV appearance. After dropping the opener, the Legends had their first win on November 26 against the Idaho Stampede, scoring 108–100. The Legends' first game in Frisco was on November 30. The Legends scored a league record of 84 points in the first half, and a 135–112 win over the Austin Toros. They began the season with a 5–1 record, the best six-game start for an expansion team in the league's history. They finished the regular season with a 24–26 record, and went to the playoffs. They were the third expansion team to play in the postseason, but were eliminated in the first round by the Tulsa 66ers.

After Nancy Lieberman, Del Harris was the head coach, starting October 4, 2011. He coached the Legends for one season, had a 24–26 record for the second consecutive year, but did not make the playoffs. Between 2012 and 2015, the Legends' head coach was former NBA player Eduardo Nájera. The team did not make the playoffs while he was head coach. On July 8, 2015, the Legends hired Nick Van Exel as the head coach. After one season, in June 2016, Exel left to be an assistant coach for the Memphis Grizzlies. He was replaced by Bob MacKinnon Jr., who had previously been the head coach when the 14ers won a D-League championship in Colorado.

Ownership
The team is owned by Texas D-League Management, LLC, which is principally owned by Donnie Nelson, former general manager and President of Basketball Operations for the Dallas Mavericks and son of former NBA head coach Don Nelson. The ownership group also includes Evan Wyly, Barry Aycock and Eduardo Nájera.

Season by season

Players

Current roster

Coaches

NBA call-ups

Source: 2015–16 Texas Legends Media Guide

Honor roll

Past notable players

Colorado 14ers
Julius Hodge
Lou Amundson
Bakari Hendrix
P. J. Tucker
Mile Ilic
Von Wafer
Mike Harris
Pooh Jeter
Mark Jones
Rick Rickert
Chuck Davis
Mo Charlo
Tony Bobbitt
Elton Brown
Davin White
Lou White
Taurean Green
Roderick Riley
Eddie Gill
John Thomas
Kaniel Dickens
Cheikh Samb
Marlon Parmer
Lamar Butler
Josh Davis
Trey Gilder
Vernon Hamilton
John Lucas III
Billy Thomas
Sonny Weems

Texas Legends
Joe Alexander
Kelenna Azubuike
Renaldo Balkman
Antonio Daniels
Chris Douglas-Roberts
Devin Ebanks
Melvin Ely
Dan Gadzuric
Reece Gaines
Terrel Harris
Bernard James
Damion James
Mike James
Ivan Johnson
Dominique Jones
Doron Lamb
Ricky Ledo
Didier Ilunga Mbenga
Rashad McCants
Fab Melo
James Nunnally
Greg Ostertag
Sean Singletary
Alando Tucker
Delonte West
Sean Williams
Yi Jianlian
Bobby Parks Jr.

NBA affiliates

Texas Legends
Dallas Mavericks (2010–present)

Colorado 14ers
Chicago Bulls (2006–2007)
Denver Nuggets (2006–2009)
New Jersey Nets (2006–2009)
Toronto Raptors (2006–2008)

References

External links

 Texas Legends official website

 
Basketball teams established in 2010
Sports in Frisco, Texas
2010 establishments in Texas
Basketball teams in Texas